Windows is a solo studio album by American singer Amanda Somerville.

Track listing

Personnel
Amanda Somerville - lead & backing vocals, keyboards
Sascha Paeth - guitars, backing vocals, producer, engineer, mixing and mastering
Miro - keyboards, backing vocals, producer, engineer, mixing and mastering
Olaf Reitmeier - bass
Robert Hunecke-Rizzo - drums

References

External links
Amanda Somerville official website
Amanda Somerville - Windows at Discogs
Amanda Somerville - Windows review at Femme Metal Webzine

2008 debut albums